Wyatt is a city in Mississippi County, Missouri, United States. The population was 219 at the 2020 census. It is the easternmost city west of the Mississippi River.

History
Wyatt was originally called Pevey Switch, and under the latter name got its start in 1881 when the railroad was extended to that point. A post office called Wyatt has been in operation since 1895. The present name is after William Wyatt, an early settler.

The Cotton Belt 5.3-mile rail line, between Bird's Point and Wyatt, was abandoned by ICC order on October 9, 1938. In late 1941, an oil pipeline was laid on the old Cotton Belt right-of-way, between Wyatt and Bird's Point, to facilitate the transportation of crude oil by barge. Cotton Belt handled railroad tank cars from Arkansas, Louisiana and Texas to Wyatt for shipment by pipeline of the oil to Bird's Point and trans loading onto barges. The 8.7-mile railroad line, between Wyatt and East Prairie, was abandoned by ICC order on April 25, 1980.

Geography
Wyatt is on Missouri Route 77 in eastern Mississippi County, just west of the Mississippi River. The village of Wilson City lies opposite U.S. Route 62 to the north. Wyatt is on the western edge of the Birds Point-New Madrid Floodway.

Demographics

2010 census
As of the census of 2010, there were 319 people, 135 households, and 84 families residing in the city. The racial makeup of the city was 84.33% White, 15.05% Black or African American, and 0.63% from two or more races. Hispanic or Latino of any race were 0.31% of the population.

There were 135 households, of which 33.3% had children under the age of 18 living with them, 45.9% were married couples living together, 10.4% had a female householder with no husband present, 5.9% had a male householder with no wife present, and 37.8% were non-families. 33.3% of all households were made up of individuals, and 12.6% had someone living alone who was 65 years of age or older. The average household size was 2.36 and the average family size was 3.00.

The median age in the city was 37.9 years. 27% of residents were under the age of 18; 6.9% were between the ages of 18 and 24; 23.5% were from 25 to 44; 27.6% were from 45 to 64; and 15% were 65 years of age or older. The gender makeup of the city was 50.5% male and 49.5% female.

2000 census
As of the census of 2000, there were 364 people, 163 households, and 108 families residing in the city. The population density was 316.7 people per square mile (122.2/km). There were 185 housing units at an average density of 160.9 per square mile (62.1/km). The racial makeup of the city was 89.84% White, 6.87% African American, and 3.30% from two or more races.

There were 163 households, out of which 28.2% had children under the age of 18 living with them, 47.9% were married couples living together, 13.5% had a female householder with no husband present, and 33.7% were non-families. 30.7% of all households were made up of individuals, and 20.9% had someone living alone who was 65 years of age or older. The average household size was 2.23 and the average family size was 2.69.

In the city the population was spread out, with 22.3% under the age of 18, 8.0% from 18 to 24, 22.8% from 25 to 44, 24.7% from 45 to 64, and 22.3% who were 65 years of age or older. The median age was 42 years. For every 100 females there were 89.6 males. For every 100 females age 18 and over, there were 86.2 males.

The median income for a household in the city was $19,444, and the median income for a family was $21,528. Males had a median income of $20,750 versus $18,750 for females. The per capita income for the city was $13,646. About 19.6% of families and 20.2% of the population were below the poverty line, including 38.0% of those under age 18 and 10.2% of those age 65 or over.

References

External links

Cities in Mississippi County, Missouri
Cities in Missouri